CIBC FirstCaribbean International Bank (FCIB) is a financial services company based in Barbados and the Caribbean subsidiary of the Canadian Imperial Bank of Commerce (CIBC). The bank was founded in 2002 as FirstCaribbean International Bank through the merger of the Caribbean operations of Barclays Bank and CIBC, and in March 2006 both CIBC and Barclays announced that Barclays wished to exercise their option to exit the Caribbean venture completely resulting in CIBC gaining majority-control of the bank. In June 2011, it was announced the bank would be renamed CIBC FirstCaribbean Bank "to be more closely aligned to the CIBC brand, while still maintaining the FirstCaribbean name and local identity." The majority of the bank's revenues are generated by its operations in Barbados, the Bahamas and the Cayman Islands.

History
Prior to 2002, the operations of what is now FirstCaribbean were run as the separate businesses of Barclays Bank and CIBC West Indies, part of CIBC's group of companies. Barclays had been active in the region since 1836 and CIBC's foray into the region began with branches in Jamaica in 1920.

In March 2006, CIBC officials announced their intention of buying majority control of their publicly held Caribbean joint venture the FirstCaribbean International Bank. The deal costing just over US$1billion (Bds$2 billion) would purchase the current 43.7% owned by Barclays Bank PLC and would raise CIBC's current ownership to 87.4%, from 43.7%.  Upon closure of the deal, the top four Caribbean commercial banks would be consolidated merely to a top three, with those being Scotiabank, the FirstCaribbean International Bank, and the Royal Bank of Canada with a possible distant fourth-place bank varying in each territory.  Following the deal, the regional head-office for FCIB was expected to remain located in Barbados, with that regional centre continuing to report to the Toronto CIBC head-office.
The deal closed on December 23, 2006.

CIBC absorbs Barclays share (2006)

On March 13, 2006, CIBC and Barclays announced that they had signed a non-binding letter of intent enabling CIBC to acquire 43.7% of the shares of FCIB from Barclays. Upon completion of the transaction, CIBC's ownership was to increase to approximately 87.4% of FCIB.

CIBC announced on 22 December 2006 that it had purchased 599,401,230 shares of FirstCaribbean from Barclays for US$988,652,389 (representing US$1.62 per share plus accrued but unpaid dividends). Barclays also retained their option to tender all or a part of the remaining holdings of 66,600,137 shares. Thereafter, CIBC proceeded with a mandatory purchase offer to all remaining shareholders at US$1.62 per share and wound up holding 91.5% of First Caribbean International Bank.

FirstCaribbean is not the only Canadian controlled bank in the region: Scotiabank, and the Royal Bank of Canada also have extensive commercial banking businesses in the region and treat the region as a native market.

Cancelled plans for United States IPO (2018)
In March 2018, CIBC announced that it had filed a Registration Statement on Form F-1 with the United States Securities and Exchange Commission relating to a proposed initial public offering (IPO) in the United States of CIBC FirstCaribbean's common shares on the New York Stock Exchange. Through the IPO, CIBC would divest itself of most of its 91.5% stake in FCIB to refocus capital and management resources on its other North American operations.

Due to a lack of interest in the American markets for CIBC's share, for "US$240-million by offering 9.6 million shares", the application for an IPO was withdrawn by CIBC on April 19, 2018.

Regulatory failure for proposed sale to GNB (2021)
CIBC, which owned in February 2021 nearly 92 per cent of FCIB, announced in late 2019 a transaction by which it would sell its share in FCIB to "GNB Financial Group , a company run by Colombian banker and real estate developer Jaime Gilinski." The transaction "failed to win regulators' approval because of uncertainty about the buyer". According to one report, "GNB Financial agreed to pay US$200-million in cash, and CIBC had promised to finance the rest of the purchase price, keeping a 24.9-per-cent stake in FirstCaribbean in the process... The lead regulator reviewing the deal was the Central Bank of Barbados, with additional oversight from the Eastern Caribbean Central Bank." The CIBC is in a hunt for capital to increase its CET1 ratio.

Locations
FirstCaribbean has branches in the following Caribbean countries and territories:

Offshore
As well as providing financial services to residents of the Caribbean countries where it operates, FirstCaribbean is also a provider of offshore financial services to non-residents.

Membership
FirstCaribbean is a member of various Bankers Associations throughout the Caribbean region. Additionally FirstCaribbean also offers a co-branded University of the West Indies VISA-Classic, Gold or Platinum credit card for students, alumni and staff. FCIB is also a member of:

 MasterCard Worldwide
 VISA International
 Maestro ATM Network
 CarIFS ATM Network
 MultiLink Network ATM network

FCIB is listed on the Barbados Stock Exchange and the Trinidad and Tobago Stock Exchange; and was formerly listed on the, Jamaica Stock Exchange, Bahamas Securities Exchange, and Eastern Caribbean Securities Exchanges.

See also

List of banks in the Americas
Republic Bank - previously divested stake in Canadian Imperial Bank of Commerce (West Indies) Holdings Limited in 1994

References

External links

News and articles
FirstCaribbean continues to work with regional unions - June 15, 2007: Barbados Advocate
FirstCaribbean’s finally share tally: CIBC 92%, other shareholders 8% -  May 10, 2007: The Broad Street Journal online
FirstCaribbean to invest US$9m in new Barbados Bank Business Centre - July 4, 2006: Barbados Advocate
CIBC takes control - March 20, 2006: Trinidad and Tobago Express
'Excellent year' for First Caribbean - December 23, 2005:  Jamaica Observer daily news
ABN AMRO’s banking operations in Curaçao to join with FirstCaribbean International Bank -  November 24, 2005: Caribbean Net News
FirstCaribbean exceeds US$4 billion loan mark - Thursday, April 28, 2005: Caribbean Net News

Banks of Barbados
Canadian Imperial Bank of Commerce
Companies listed on the Barbados Stock Exchange
2002 establishments in Barbados
Barclays
Banks established in 2002